Andraos is an Arabic surname. It is commonly found in Lebanon in the villages of Jaj, Kousba and Damour and Nabay. Notable people with the surname include:

 Fady Andraos, Palestinian-Lebanese singer and actor
 Martine Andraos
 Amale Andraos

Surnames of Arabic origin